Arata is both a Japanese and Italian surname, and a masculine Japanese given name. As an Italian surname, it means "plow", while in Japanese, its meaning depends on the kanji used to write it.

Surname
In Japanese, Arata is typically written using kanji meaning "uncultivated field" or "new field", though dozens of other ways of writing it also exist. People with these surnames include:
, Japanese swimmer
, Japanese fusion power researcher
, Japanese academic in the fields of engineering and physics
, Japanese football striker in the J-League
Mackenyu, full name , American actor of Japanese descent

Arata is also an Italian surname, from a southern Italian word for "plow". People with this surname include:

Luis Arata (1895–1967), Argentine stage and film actor
Ubaldo Arata (1895–1947), Italian cinematographer
Tony Arata (born 1957), American singer-songwriter
Michael Arata (born 1966), American actor and film producer

Given name
As a given name, Arata is typically written using a kanji meaning "new", though other ways of writing it are also seen (e.g. ). People with these given names include:

, Japanese politician and educator
, Japanese architect
, Japanese architect
, Japanese physician and public health expert
, Japanese actor
, Japanese actor and model
, Japanese sumo wrestler
, Japanese football defender in the J-League
, Japanese marathon runner
, Japanese football midfielder in the Indian Super League
, Japanese football defender in the J-League
, Japanese female team handball player
, Japanese baseball player
, Japanese judoka

Fictional characters with these given names include:
, a main character in the 2000s and 2010s Japanese manga series Chihayafuru
, a main character in the 2010s Japanese manga series Trinity Seven
, a character from the anime series Haikyū!! with the position of libero from Johzenji High

References

Italian-language surnames
Japanese-language surnames
Japanese masculine given names